A pyrena or pyrene (commonly called a "pit" or "stone") is the fruitstone within a drupe or drupelet produced by the ossification of the endocarp or lining of the fruit. It consists of a hard endocarp tissue surrounding one or more seeds (also called the "kernel"). The hardened endocarp which constitutes the pyrene provides a protective physical barrier around the seed, shielding it from pathogens and herbivory.

While many drupes are monopyrenous, containing only one pyrene, pome-type fruit with a hard, stony (rather than leathery) endocarp are typically polypyrenous drupes, containing multiple pyrenes.

Development 
The hardening of the endocarp of a developing drupe occurs via secondary cell wall formation and lignification. The biopolymer lignin, also found in wood, provides a structure within secondary cell walls which supports the polymerisation of cellulose and hemicellulose; together these polymers provide the endocarp with tensile strength and stiffness. Further hardening occurs during the biomineralisation of the endocarp. The biomineralisation of pyrenes during the life of the plant can aid the preservation of fruit remains in archaeological findings.

Gallery

See also 
 Nut (fruit)

References

Bibliography 

 
 
 
 
 
 
 

Plant anatomy
Drupes